Tagalog Republic (more precisely "Republic of the Tagalog Nation/People")  is a term used to refer to two revolutionary governments involved in the Philippine Revolution against the Spanish Empire and the Philippine–American War. Both were connected to the Katipunan revolutionary movement.

Etymology
The term Tagalog commonly refers to both an ethno-linguistic group in the Philippines and their language. Katagalugan often refers to the Tagalog-speaking regions of the island of Luzon in the Philippine archipelago.

However, the Katipunan secret society extended the meaning of these terms to all of the natives in the Philippine islands. The society's primer explains its use of Tagalog in a footnote:

The revolutionary Carlos Ronquillo wrote in his memoirs:

In this respect, Katagalugan may be translated as the "Tagalog nation."

Andrés Bonifacio, a founding member of the Katipunan and later its supreme head (Supremo), promoted the use of Katagalugan for the Philippine nation. The term "Filipino" was then reserved for Spaniards born in the islands. By eschewing "Filipino" and "Filipinas" which had colonial roots, Bonifacio and his cohorts "sought to form a national identity."

In 1896, the Philippine Revolution broke out after the discovery of the Katipunan by the authorities. Prior to the outbreak of hostilities, the Katipunan had become an open revolutionary government. The American historian John R. M. Taylor, custodian of the Philippine Insurgent Records, wrote:

Several Filipino historians concur. According to Gregorio Zaide:

Likewise, Renato Constantino and others wrote that the Katipunan served as a shadow government.

Influenced by Freemasonry, the Katipunan had been organized with "its own laws, bureaucratic structure and elective leadership". For each province it involved, the Supreme Council coordinated provincial councils which were in charge of "public administration and military affairs on the supra-municipal or quasi-provincial level" and local councils, in charge of affairs "on the district or barrio level".

Bonifacio

In the last days of August 1896, Katipunan members met in Caloocan and decided to start their revolt (the event was later called the "Cry of Balintawak" or "Cry of Pugad Lawin"; the exact location and date are disputed). A day after the Cry, the Supreme Council of the Katipunan held elections, with the following results:

The above was divulged to the Spanish by the Katipunan member Pío Valenzuela while in captivity. Teodoro Agoncillo thus wrote:

Milagros C. Guerrero and others have described Bonifacio as "effectively" the commander-in-chief of the revolutionaries. They assert:

One name for Bonifacio's concept of the Philippine nation-state appears in surviving Katipunan documents: Haring Bayang Katagalugan ("Sovereign Nation of the Tagalog People", or "Sovereign Tagalog Nation") - sometimes shortened into Haring Bayan ("Sovereign Nation"). Bayan may be rendered as "nation" or "people". The term haring bayan (sometimes haringbayan) was Bonifacio's neologism which sought to express and adapt in native terms the Western concept of "republic", from Latin res publica, meaning public thing or commonwealth. Since haring bayan means both "sovereign nation" and "sovereign people", where sovereign power is held by the nation/people, his concept was essentially democratic and republican in nature.
 
Thus Bonifacio is named as the president of the "Tagalog Republic" in an issue of the Spanish periodical La Ilustración Española y Americana published in February 1897 ("Andrés Bonifacio - Titulado "Presidente" de la República Tagala"). Another name for Bonifacio's government was Repúblika ng Katagalugan (another form of "Tagalog Republic") as evidenced by a picture of a rebel seal published in the same periodical the next month.

Official letters and one appointment paper of Bonifacio addressed to Emilio Jacinto reveal Bonifacio's various titles and designations, as follows:

 President of the Supreme Council
 Supreme President
 President of the Sovereign Nation of Katagalugan / Sovereign Tagalog Nation
 President of the Sovereign Nation, Founder of the Katipunan, Initiator of the Revolution
 Office of the Supreme President, Government of the Revolution

An 1897 power struggle at the Imus Assembly in Cavite led to command of the revolution shifting at the Tejeros Convention, where a new insurgent government was formed with Emilio Aguinaldo as president. Bonifacio refused to recognize the new government after his election as Director of the Interior was questioned by Daniel Tirona. This led to the Acta de Tejeros, the Naic Military Agreement and Bonifacio's trial and execution.

Sakay

After Emilio Aguinaldo and his men were captured by the US forces in 1901, General Macario Sakay, a veteran Katipunan member, re-established in 1902 the Tagalog Republic (or Republika ng Kapuluang Katagalugan,  kapuluan referring to the entire Philippine archipelago, as in "Philippine Islands" or "Islas Filipinas") as a continuation of Bonifacio's Katipunan government in contrast to Aguinaldo's Republic. Sakay was based in the mountains of Morong (today, the province of Rizal), and held the presidency with Francisco Carreón as vice president. In April 1904, Sakay issued a manifesto declaring Filipino right to self-determination at a time when support for independence was considered a crime by the American colonial government.

The republic ended in 1906 when Sakay and his leading followers surrendered on July 14 to the American authorities upon being promised amnesty and being convinced of the need for a Philippine Assembly as a peaceful "gate to liberty". Instead they were arrested days later at a welcoming reception party in Cavite, imprisoned at the Old Bilibid Prison in Manila, and the following year executed for banditry.  Some of its survivors escaped to Japan to be joined with Artemio Ricarte, an exiled Katipunan veteran, and later returned to support the Second Philippine Republic, a client state of Japan, during World War II.

See also
Tejeros revolutionary government
List of unofficial presidents of the Philippines

Notes

References

Former countries in Philippine history
Former unrecognized countries
Former republics
History of Calabarzon
Philippine–American War
Philippine Revolution
States and territories established in 1896
States and territories disestablished in 1902
1896 establishments in the Philippines
1896 establishments in the Spanish East Indies
1903 disestablishments in the Philippines